The Bielefeld conspiracy (German:  or) is a satirical conspiracy theory that claims that the city of Bielefeld, Germany, does not exist, but is an illusion propagated by various forces. First posted on the German Usenet in 1994, the conspiracy has since been mentioned in the city's marketing, and alluded to in a speech by former Chancellor Angela Merkel.

Synopsis
The story goes that the city of Bielefeld (population of 341,755 ) in the German state of North Rhine-Westphalia does not actually exist.

The theory poses three questions:
 Do you know anybody from Bielefeld?
 Have you ever been to Bielefeld?
 Do you know anybody who has ever been to Bielefeld?
A majority are expected to answer no to all three queries. Anybody who can answer yes to any of the queries, or claim any other knowledge about Bielefeld is promptly disregarded as being in on the conspiracy, or having been themselves deceived.

The origins of and reasons for this conspiracy are not a part of the original theory. Speculated originators jokingly include the Central Intelligence Agency, Mossad, or aliens who use Bielefeld University as a disguise for their spaceship.

History
The conspiracy theory was first made public in a posting to the newsgroup de.talk.bizarre on 16 May 1994 by Achim Held, a computer science student at the University of Kiel. When a friend of Held met someone from Bielefeld at a student party in 1993, he said "", meaning "that doesn't exist", it spread throughout the German-speaking Internet community.

In a television interview conducted for the tenth anniversary of the newsgroup posting, Held stated that this myth definitely originated from his Usenet posting which was intended only as a joke.

Historian Alan Lessoff notes that a reason for the amusement value of the theory is Bielefeld's lack of notable features, as being home to no major institutions or tourist attractions and not being on the course of a major river, "Bielefeld defines nondescript".

Public reception
The Bielefeld conspiracy remains one of the most popular Internet jokes originating in Germany.

In November 2012, German Chancellor Angela Merkel referred to the conspiracy in public when talking about a town hall meeting she had attended in Bielefeld, adding: "... if it exists at all", and "I had the impression that I was there."

Official response
The city council of Bielefeld made efforts to generate publicity for Bielefeld and build a nationally known public image of the city. However, even 10 years after the conspiracy started, the mayor's office still received phone calls and e-mails which claimed to doubt the existence of the city.

In 1999, five years after the myth started to spread, the city council released a press statement titled  (Bielefeld does exist!) on April Fools' Day. In allusion to the origin of the conspiracy, the 800th anniversary of Bielefeld was held in 2014 under the motto  (That doesn't exist).

In August 2019, the council offered to give 1 million euros to any person who could provide "incontrovertible evidence" of its nonexistence in an effort to increase interest in the city. As no one was able to prove Bielefeld's non-existence, the city therefore sees its existence as conclusive and the conspiracy as ended. To commemorate it, the city erected a glacial erratic block in the historic center near the Leineweber monument. A QR code on it directs to further background information.

Film
In 2009, film students at Bielefeld University started a project to develop a feature film based on the Bielefeld conspiracy. The project was financed by the university and local sponsors. Most of the project's staff and actors were students or university employees; a few professionals, such as the actress Julia Kahl and the cameraman Alexander Böke, also joined the project. The screenplay was written by Thomas Walden. The film premiered in Bielefeld on 2 June 2010.

Similar satirical conspiracy theories
Similar satirical conspiracy theories have been made about other places, such as Australia, Finland, the Italian region of Molise and the US state of Wyoming.

See also
 Birds Aren't Real
 Li's field
 Omission of Tasmania from maps of Australia
 Ted Cruz–Zodiac Killer meme

References

Bibliography

External links
 

Conspiracy theories in Germany
Internet memes introduced in the 1990s
Internet humor
Usenet
Bielefeld
Hoaxes in Germany
1994 in Germany
Contemporary German history
1990s in Internet culture
Culture of North Rhine-Westphalia
German satire
Satirical conspiracy theories